Porcelain Horse is a 2012 Ecuadorian drama film directed by Javier Andrade and produced by Maria Angeles Palacios. The film was selected as the Ecuadorian entry for the Best Foreign Language Film at the 86th Academy Awards, but it was not nominated.

Cast

 Victor Arauz as Luis
 Andrés Crespo as Lagarto
 Alejandro Fajardo as Rodrigo
 Leovanna Orlandini as Lucía
 Francisco Savinovich as Paco

See also
 List of submissions to the 86th Academy Awards for Best Foreign Language Film
 List of Ecuadorian submissions for the Academy Award for Best Foreign Language Film

References

External links
 

2012 films
2012 drama films
Ecuadorian drama films
2010s Spanish-language films